The 2021 Formula Regional Americas Championship powered by Honda was the fourth season for the FIA Formula 3 regional series across North America, and the second season under the Formula Regional moniker after a rebrand in 2020. The series was sanctioned by SCCA Pro Racing, the professional racing division of the Sports Car Club of America. Drivers competed to win a Honda-backed Super Formula seat in 2022.

Kyffin Simpson took the drivers' championship at the last round at the Circuit of the Americas, while TJ Speed Motorsports secured the teams' title.

Teams and drivers 
All drivers competed with Honda-powered Ligier JS F3 cars on Hankook tires.

 Erikson Evans was contracted to drive for Velocity Racing Development, but didn't appear in any rounds.

Race calendar 
The 2021 calendar was announced on 5 November 2020. Each round featured three races. A pre-season test was held at Virginia International Raceway as well as a Winter Cup at the road course of Homestead-Miami Speedway in February. Two rounds at Sonoma and Laguna Seca were later replaced by Road America and Brainerd International Raceway. The round at Circuit Trois-Rivières in Quebec, Canada - the planned first international event for the series - was cancelled due to border restrictions and replaced with a round at Mid-Ohio Sports Car Course.

Championship standings

Points were awarded as follows:

Drivers' standings

Teams' standings 
Only a team's two best-finishing cars were eligible for teams' championship points.

Notes

References

External links 

 Official website: 

Formula Regional Americas Championship
Formula Regional Americas Championship
Regional Americas Championship
Formula Regional Americas